Mika Pieniniemi (born April 26, 1966) is a Finnish ice hockey coach. He was the head coach of KalPa during the 2005–06 and 2006–07 SM-liiga seasons.

References
Mika Pieniniemi's profile at EliteProspects.com

1966 births
Living people
Finnish ice hockey coaches
Sportspeople from Oulu